Theodor von Jürgensen (11 April 1840 – 8 May 1907) was a German internist who was a native of Flensburg, Schleswig-Holstein.

He studied medicine at the Universities of Kiel, Breslau and Tübingen, earning his doctorate in 1863. Afterwards he was a lecturer in Kiel, where in 1869 he became an associate professor and head of its medical clinic. In 1873, he became a full professor of general therapy and director of the local policlinic at Tübingen, a position he maintained until his death in 1907.

Jürgensen specialized in research of cardiovascular disease, and is remembered for his work involving treatment of pneumonia and measles.

Selected publications 
 Klinische Studien über die Behandlung des Abdominaltyphus mittels des kalten Wassers (Studies on the treatment of abdominal typhus using cold water); (1866)
 Die Körperwärme des gesunden Menschen (Body temperature of healthy persons); (1873)
 Kruppöse Pneumonie Katarrhalpneumonie, in Hugo Wilhelm von Ziemssen's "Handbuch der speciellen Pathologie und Therapie", (1874)
 Antiphlogistische Heilmethoden, Blutentziehungen Transfusion, in Ziemssen's "Handbuch der allgemeinen Therapie", (1880)
 Kruppöse Pneumonie: Beobachtungen aus der Tübinger Poliklinik (Croupous pneumonia: Observations from the Tübingen Polyclinic); (1883)
 Mitteilungen aus der Tübinger Poliklinik, (1886)
 Lehrbuch der speciellen Pathologie und Therapie (Textbook of special pathology and therapy); (1893)
 Acute Exantheme: Allgemeines, Masern, Scharlach, Rötheln, Varicellen (Acute exanthema: measles, scarlet fever, rubella, varicella); (1894–96)
 Erkrankungen der Kreislaufsorgane, Insufficienz, Schwäche, des Herzens (Diseases of the circulatory organs: Insufficiency, weakness of the heart);  (1899)

References 

 Zeno.org translated biography @ Pagel:Biographical Dictionary

External links
 

German internists
People from Flensburg
Academic staff of the University of Tübingen
1907 deaths
1840 births